
My Woman, My Woman, My Wife is a 1970 studio album by Dean Martin, arranged by John Bahler, Glen D. Hardin and Billy Strange.

The album peaked at 97 on the Billboard 200 and at 92 on the Australian Kent Music Report. It was reissued on CD by Capitol Records in 2006 and Hip-O Records in 2009. Martin was recording infrequently at this stage of his career, recording for only two days every spring to produce a new album and otherwise recording an occasional singles session.

My Woman, My Woman, My Wife was advertised by Reprise Records as Martin's open letter to the Women's liberation movement. The advert ended with the statement "Take that, ladies".

Reception

The initial Billboard review from 22 August 1970 commented that "Martin has everything going for him". William Ruhlmann on Allmusic.com gave the album two and a half stars out of five. Ruhlmann criticized Martin's lack of emotional commitment to the lyrics of the title song, and of Bowen and Martin's collaboration adds that "Martin obliged, and Bowen provided his usual Nashville sound-style production. But this was nothing the two hadn't done many times before, and record buyers were losing interest".

Track listing 
Side One:  
 "My Woman, My Woman, My Wife" (Marty Robbins) - 3:30
 "Once a Day" (Bill Anderson) - 2:44
 "Here We Go Again" (Don Lanier, Red Steagall) - 3:07
 "Make the World Go Away" (Hank Cochran) - 2:47
 "The Tip of My Fingers" (Anderson) - 2:28

Side Two:
 "Detroit City" (Danny Dill, Mel Tillis) - 3:43
 "Together Again" (Buck Owens) - 2:32
 "Heart Over Mind" (Tillis) - 2:44
 "Turn the World Around" (Ben Peters) - 2:24
 "It Keeps Right On A-Hurtin''" (Johnny Tillotson) - 2:42

Personnel 
 Dean Martin – vocals
 John Bahler - arranger
 Glen D. Hardin
 Billy Strange
 Ed Thrasher - art direction
 Eddie Brackett - engineer	
 Chuck Britz
 Jimmy Bowen - record producer

References 

1970 albums
Dean Martin albums
Albums arranged by Billy Strange
Albums produced by Jimmy Bowen
Reprise Records albums